Colusa is a city and county seat of Colusa County, California, located in the Sacramento Valley region of the Central Valley. The population was 5,971 at the 2010 census, up from 5,402 at the 2000 census. Colusi originates from the local Coru Native American tribe, who in the 1840s lived on the opposite side of the Sacramento River.

History

In 1850, Charles D. Semple purchased the Rancho Colus Mexican land grant on which Colusa was founded and called the place Salmon Bend. The town was founded, under the name Colusi, by Semple in 1850. The first post office was established the following year, 1851. The California legislature changed the town's (and the county's) name to Colusa in 1854. The town flourished due to its location on the Southern Pacific Railroad. Several travelers rest stops were established at various road distances from Colusa, including Five Mile House, Seven Mile House, Nine Mile House, Ten Mile House, Eleven Mile House, Fourteen Mile House (also called Sterling Ranch), Sixteen Mile House (at the current location of Princeton), and Seventeen Mile House. The original settlement of what became Colusa was originally placed at the site of Seven Mile House but subsequently removed to its current site in 1850.

The lynching of Hong Di
On July 10, 1887, convicted murderer Hong Di, an immigrant from China, was dragged from the Colusa jail and was forced by over a hundred and fifty men through the streets of Colusa's Chinatown, before he was hanged from the rafters of the locomotive turntable of the Colusa and Lake Railroad. Di, who had worked as a servant for the Billiou family of St. Johns, California, had shot and killed his employer Julie Billiou on April 7, 1887. He was captured on May 22, 1887, near Gridley, California.

Geography

Colusa is on the Sacramento River, which has a high levee so that the river is not clearly apparent from the city.

Colusa features a historic Chinatown, Carnegie Library building constructed in 1905, and an architecturally noteworthy courthouse built in a classical style, among its historically notable buildings.

Climate
According to the Köppen Climate Classification system, Colusa has a warm-summer Mediterranean climate, abbreviated "Csa" on climate maps.

<div style="width:80%">

Climate events

During December 1996 - January 1997, the nearby Colusa Weir Gage reached flood stage. This historic flooding event devastated the region by destroying thousands of crop acres (rice, tomatoes, alfalfa) and property. The Colusa Weir Gage reached flood stage 68.67 feet on 1/3/1997.

Film production
The crime drama movie ...tick...tick...tick... (1970), starring Jim Brown, was filmed in downtown Colusa, featuring the historic courthouse. The setting of the film in Mississippi is referred to as "Colusa County". The movie explores what happens when an African-American is elected sheriff for the town.

Demographics

2010
At the 2010 census Colusa had a population of 5,971. The racial makeup of Colusa was 3,944 (66.1%) White, 54 (0.9%) African American, 107 (1.8%) Native American, 80 (1.3%) Asian, 28 (0.5%) Pacific Islander, 1,510 (25.3%) from other races, and 248 (4.2%) from two or more races. Hispanic or Latino of any race were 3,128 persons (52.4%).

The census reported that 5,916 people (99.1% of the population) lived in households, 4 (0.1%) lived in non-institutionalized group quarters, and 51 (0.9%) were institutionalized.

There were 2,142 households, 890 (41.5%) had children under the age of 18 living in them, 1,080 (50.4%) were opposite-sex married couples living together, 290 (13.5%) had a female householder with no husband present, 135 (6.3%) had a male householder with no wife present. There were 128 (6.0%) unmarried opposite-sex partnerships, and 13 (0.6%) same-sex married couples or partnerships. 555 households (25.9%) were one person and 224 (10.5%) had someone living alone who was 65 or older. The average household size was 2.76. There were 1,505 families (70.3% of households); the average family size was 3.35.

The age distribution was 1,789 people (30.0%) under the age of 18, 484 people (8.1%) aged 18 to 24, 1,566 people (26.2%) aged 25 to 44, 1,435 people (24.0%) aged 45 to 64, and 697 people (11.7%) who were 65 or older. The median age was 33.5 years. For every 100 females, there were 100.1 males. For every 100 females age 18 and over, there were 96.2 males.

The median value of a home was $196,400. There were 2,282 housing units at an average density of ,of which 2,142 were occupied, 1,191 (55.6%) by the owners and 951 (44.4%) by renters.  The homeowner vacancy rate was 1.4%; the rental vacancy rate was 2.3%. 3,233 people (54.1% of the population) lived in owner-occupied housing units and 2,683 people (44.9%) lived in rental housing units.

2000
At the 2000 census there were 5,402 people in 1,897 households, including 1,365 families, in the city. The racial makeup of the city was 68.7% White, 0.3% Black or African American, 1.8% Native American, 1.5% Asian, 0.8% Pacific Islander, 23.3% from other races, and 3.8% from two or more races. 41.7% of the population were Hispanic or Latino of any race.
Of the 1,897 households 40.6% had children under the age of 18 living with them, 54.7% were married couples living together, 11.8% had a female householder with no husband present, and 28.0% were non-families. 23.7% of households were one person and 10.8% were one person aged 65 or older. The average household size was 2.81 and the average family size was 3.33.

The age distribution was 30.2% under the age of 18, 10.2% from 18 to 24, 28.2% from 25 to 44, 20.0% from 45 to 64, and 11.4% 65 or older. The median age was 32 years. For every 100 females, there were 99.7 males. For every 100 females age 18 and over, there were 98.9 males.

The median income for a household in the city was $35,250, and the median family income  was $41,833. Males had a median income of $32,006 versus $20,510 for females. The per capita income for the city was $15,251. About 14.2% of families and 17.2% of the population were below the poverty line, including 20.0% of those under age 18 and 8.9% of those age 65 or over.

Economy
Colusa County industry is dominated by agriculture, primarily in rice crops and tree nuts like almonds and walnuts. It's one of the top rice producing counties in the United States with over 135,000 acres harvested in 2016.

Major employers in Colusa include Colusa County and Colusa Unified School District. Sunsweet Growers has a plant just outside of city limits.

Politics

Education
Colusa is served by the Colusa Unified School District formed by three schools: Burchfield Primary School, Egling Middle School, and Colusa High School. The high school's mascot is the Redhawks. Starting in the 2011–12 academic year, the name of the high school mascot was changed from the Redskins to the Redhawks amid controversy over using names and insignia deemed derogatory toward Native Americans.

Notable people
 Bill Cunningham, Major League Baseball player
 Byron De La Beckwith, convicted assassin of civil rights activist Medgar Evers
 Mike Griffin, Major League Baseball pitcher

References

External links

 

 
Cities in Colusa County, California
County seats in California
Incorporated cities and towns in California
Populated places on the Sacramento River
Populated places established in 1850
1850 establishments in California
Populated places established in 1868
1868 establishments in California